Sally Anne Struthers (born July 28, 1947) is an American actress and activist. She played Gloria Stivic, the daughter of Archie and Edith Bunker (played by Carroll O'Connor and Jean Stapleton) on All in the Family, for which she won two Emmy awards, and Babette on Gilmore Girls. She was also the voice of Charlene Sinclair on the ABC sitcom Dinosaurs and Rebecca Cunningham on the Disney animated series TaleSpin.

Early life

Sally Anne Struthers was born July 28, 1947, in Portland, Oregon, the second of two daughters born to Margaret Caroline (née Jernes) and Robert Alden Struthers, a surgeon. She has an older sister, Sue. Her maternal grandparents were Norwegian immigrants.

Her father abandoned the family when Struthers was approximately nine years old, after which she was raised by her single mother in the Concordia neighborhood of northeast Portland. Her mother, who supported herself and her two daughters working at Bonneville Power Administration, suffered from significant depression during Struthers' childhood.

Career
In Five Easy Pieces (1970) Struthers was cast opposite Jack Nicholson. She appeared as a restless wife of a veterinarian in The Getaway (1972). Around that time Struthers debuted as Gloria Stivic on the 1970s sitcom All in the Family. Producer Norman Lear had found the actress dancing on The Smothers Brothers Comedy Hour.

According to a WPTT radio interview with Doug Hoerth in 2003, Struthers thought that Reiner's then-fiancée and later wife, Penny Marshall, would get the role of Gloria, as Marshall more resembled Jean Stapleton, who played Edith Bunker. Actress Candice Azzara had played the role of Gloria in a pilot episode, but was soon dropped. After a shaky start, the series became a hit beginning with its summer reruns, giving tens of millions of viewers the chance to see "Gloria" defending her liberal viewpoints about negative stereotypes and inequality. Struthers won two Emmy Awards (in 1972 and 1979) for her work on the show. In 2012, Struthers recalled the serendipity that helped her land the role: 

In 1977 she portrayed a housewife who was physically abused by her husband (portrayed by Dennis Weaver) in the made-for-TV movie Intimate Strangers, one of the first network features to depict domestic violence.

On the short-lived Archie Bunker's Place spin-off Gloria (1982–1983), Struthers reprised Gloria as a new divorcée (she became an "exchange student", when husband Mike exchanged her for one of his students). The series co-starred Burgess Meredith as the doctor of an animal clinic with Gloria as his assistant. From 1985 to 1986 Struthers starred as Florence Ungar in the female version of The Odd Couple. Struthers later stated in an interview on Gilbert Gottfried's Amazing Colossal Podcast, that it was an unpleasant experience until Rita Moreno, who was mean-spirited towards Struthers, left the play and was replaced by Brenda Vaccaro.

She was a semi-regular panelist on the 1990 revival of Match Game and an occasional guest on Win, Lose or Draw (even filling in for Vicki Lawrence as host for a week). She also had a recurring role as Bill Miller's manipulative mother, Louise, on Still Standing and regularly appeared on Gilmore Girls as Babette Dell. She also provided voices for a number of animated series such as The Pebbles and Bamm-Bamm Show (as a teenage Pebbles Flintstone), TaleSpin (as Rebecca Cunningham) and was one of the voice stars on ABC's Dinosaurs produced by Walt Disney and Henson Productions (as Charlene Sinclair).

Struthers starred in the stage production of Annie at the Fabulous Fox Theatre in Atlanta, Georgia, and in the national tour of the production in the late 1990s. She has been a regular since the early 2000s at the Ogunquit Playhouse, in Ogunquit, Maine.

In 2014, Struthers toured in the 50th-anniversary production of Hello, Dolly!, playing Dolly Levi.

In  Spring of 2023 Struthers will star in CLUE at a local theater on Long Island, located in New York.

Activism
Struthers has been a spokesperson for Christian Children's Fund (later renamed ChildFund), advocating on behalf of impoverished children in developing countries.

Business interests
Struthers has been a spokesperson for International Correspondence School (ICS) in television ads, pitching the famous line "Do you want to make more money? Sure, we all do!" ICS was a school with a diverse curriculum that, at the time, had fields of study going from brick laying to personal computers.

Personal life
Struthers married psychiatrist William C. Rader on December 18, 1977, in Los Angeles. After having one child, daughter Samantha, the couple divorced on January 19, 1983.

Filmography

Film
{| class="wikitable plainrowheaders sortable" style="margin-right: 0;"
|-
! scope="col" | Year
! scope="col" | Title
! scope="col" | Role
! scope="col" class="unsortable" | Notes
! scope="col" class="unsortable" | 
|-
! scope="row" | 1970
| 
| World's No. 1 Fan
|
| style="text-align:center;"|
|-
! scope="row"| 1970
| Five Easy Pieces
| Shirley "Betty"
|
| style="text-align:center;"|
|-
! scope="row"| 1972
| 
| Fran Clinton
|
| style="text-align:center;"|
|-
! scope="row"| 1974
| Aloha Means Goodbye 
| Sara Moore
| Television film
| style="text-align:center;"|
|-
! scope="row"| 1975
| Hey, I'm Alive 
| Helen Klaben
| Television film
| style="text-align:center;"|
|-
! scope="row"| 1976
|  
| Bess Houdini
|
| style="text-align:center;"|
|-
! scope="row"| 1977
| Intimate Strangers 
| Janice Halston
| Television film
| style="text-align:center;"|
|-
! scope="row"| 1978
| My Husband is Missing 
| Mrs. Katherine Eaton
| Television film
| style="text-align:center;"|
|-
! scope="row"| 1978
|  
| Cameo
| Short film
| style="text-align:center;"|
|-
! scope="row"| 1979
| ...And Your Name Is Jonah
| Jenny Corelli
|
| style="text-align:center;"|
|-
! scope="row"| 1981
| A Gun in the House 
| Emily Cates
| Television film
| style="text-align:center;"|
|-
! scope="row"| 1989
| A Deadly Silence 
| Aunt Marilyn
| Television film
| style="text-align:center;"|
|-
! scope="row"| 1990
| TaleSpin: Plunder & Lightning 
| Rebecca Cunningham
| Television film; voice role
| style="text-align:center;"|
|-
! scope="row"| 1992
| In the Best Interest of the Children
| Patty Pepper
| Television film
| style="text-align:center;"|
|-
! scope="row"| 1997
|   
| Mrs. Zelov
|
| style="text-align:center;"|
|-
! scope="row"| 2001
| Out of the Black| Betty
|
| style="text-align:center;"|
|-
! scope="row"| 2001
| A Month of Sundays 
| Onida Roy
|
| style="text-align:center;"|
|-
! scope="row"| 2003
|  Reeseville 
| Katie Oakman
|
| style="text-align:center;"|
|-
! scope="row"| 2003
| Baadasssss! 
| Roz
|
| style="text-align:center;"|
|-
! scope="row"| 2005
| Hoodwinked!| Granny Abigail Puckett
| Lines overdubbed by Glenn Close
| style="text-aign:center;"|
|-
! scope="row"| 2006
| What I Did for Love| Aunt Trudy
| Television film
| style="text-align:center;"|
|-
! scope="row"| 2010
| Monster Heroes 
| Kripta
|
| style="text-align:center;"|
|-
! scope="row"| 2014
| Waiting in the Wings: the Musical 
| Sperm Bank Receptionist
|
| style="text-align:center;"|
|-
! scope="row"| 2015
| Hollywood Musical! 
| Sally
|
| style="text-align:center;"|
|-
! scope="row"| 2016
| Still Waiting in the Wings 
| Lucy
|
| style="text-align:center;"|
|-
! scope="row"| 2017
| data-sort-value="Relationship"| The Relationtrip| Liam's Mom 
| Voice role
| style="text-align:center;"|
|-
! scope="row"| 2017
| You & Me| Tilly
|
| style="text-align:center;"|
|-
! scope="row"| 2018
| Christmas Harmony  
| Shirley
| Television film
| style="text-align:center;"|
|-
|}

Television

Stage
 Wally's Cafe (1981) ... Janet (Broadway: Brooks Atkinson Theatre)The Odd Couple (1985–1986) ... Florence Ungar (Broadway: Broadhurst Theatre)Grease (1994–1998) ... Miss Lynch (Broadway: Eugene O'Neill Theatre)
 Annie (1998–1999) ... Miss Hannigan, 20th Anniversary National Tour
 Nunsense (2008) ... Mother Superior, 25th Anniversary Tour
 Hello, Dolly! (2013–2014) ... Dolly Levi, 50th Anniversary Tour
 Young Frankenstein (2022) ... Frau Blucher (McCoy/Rigby Ent. / La Mirada Theatre, CA)

Awards and nominations
Primetime Emmy Awards
1971 Primetime Emmy Award for Outstanding Supporting Actress in a Comedy Series (tied with Valerie Harper)
1979 Primetime Emmy Award for Outstanding Supporting Actress in a Comedy Series

Ovation Awards
2010: Won the award for Featured Actress in a Musical for the role of the "Fairy Godmother" in the Cabrillo Music Theatre production of CinderellaIn popular culture
Struthers was satirized in South Park'', mainly the episodes "Starvin' Marvin" (1997) and "Starvin' Marvin in Space" (1999), in the latter she resembles Jabba the Hutt and eats the Christian Children's Fund's food herself.

References

External links

Sally Struthers at Voice Chasers

1947 births
Living people
20th-century American actresses
21st-century American actresses
American activists  
American Christians
Actresses from Portland, Oregon
American film actresses
American people of Norwegian descent
American television actresses
American voice actresses
Grant High School (Portland, Oregon) alumni
Outstanding Performance by a Supporting Actress in a Comedy Series Primetime Emmy Award winners